The Portland State Vikings men's basketball team represents Portland State University in Portland, Oregon. The team was also once referred to as "The Park Block Bombers" in reference to the school's proximity to Portland's string of park blocks.  The school's team competes in the Big Sky Conference. The team appearances in the NCAA Division I men's basketball tournament have been in 2008 and 2009. The head coach of the Vikings is Jase Coburn.

Conference affiliations
 1946–47 to 1948–49 – NAIA Independent
 1949–50 to 1964–65 – Oregon Collegiate Conference
 1965–66 to 1980–81 – NCAA Division II Independent
 1981–82 to 1995–96 – no team
 1996–97 to present – Big Sky Conference

Postseason results

NCAA tournament results
The Vikings have appeared in two NCAA tournaments, with a combined record of 0–2.

Through 2019, Portland State has not participated in the National Invitation Tournament (NIT).

CIT results
The Vikings have appeared in the CollegeInsider.com Postseason Tournament (CIT) two times, with a combined record of 0–2.

NAIA tournament results
The Vikings appeared in the NAIA Tournament two times, with a combined record of 0–2.

Vikings in the NBA

Ime Udoka, current coach. Boston Celtics
Freeman Williams, former guard
Dan Burke, current coach. Philadelphia 76ers

Portland State men's basketball players in professional teams

References

External links